Bizenkhel is a town and union council of Bannu District in the Khyber Pakhtunkhwa Province of Pakistan. It is located at 33°1'20N 70°41'55E and has an altitude of 346 metres (1138 feet).

Notable persons
 Maulana Noor Muhammad

References

Union councils of Bannu District
Populated places in Bannu District